Sheoraphuli Surendra Nath Vidyaniketan was established in 1963 by famous Jute Merchant Late Surendra Nath Ghosh who did many benevolent social work in his locality. This school is a Bengali medium school at Sheoraphuli, West Bengal, India. Students of the school appear for 10th (Madhyamik) examination under the West Bengal Board of Secondary Education and 12th (Higher Secondary Examination) examination under the West Bengal Council of Higher Secondary Education.

Grades 5 to 10 are divided into three sections . Grade 11 and 12 have three streams - science, arts and commerce. The day section of this school is boys-only with a strength of 1300 students.

The morning section has primary and girls section, housed in the same building. The students come mostly from the Sheoraphuli and Baidyabati area.

School uniform 
White shirt with navy blue shorts or trousers for boys and white shirt with navy blue skirt, with white socks and black shoes. In winter, navy blue sweaters are allowed.

Facilities 
 Library
 Physics lab
 Chemistry lab
 Biology lab
 Computer Sc Lab
 Auditorium
 Computer facilities
 Play ground

The Auditorium is dedicated to Late Dr Bimal Kumar Ghosh (Eldest son of Late Surendra nath Ghosh) for his good works for the school.

Student life and culture 
Saraswati puja, Independence Day, Teacher's Day, Freshers Day(Nabin Baron), Annual Sports, Inter-class Cricket & Football Tournament, occasional magic show, debate, quiz, school magazine.

Notable teachers 
Shri Uma Pada Singha - First Head Master of the Boys' Section 
Shri Sib Sambhu Bhattacharyya
 Jibesh Chkraborty - Member of the West Bengal State Legislative Assembly (MLA)

Notable alumni 
 Akbar Ali Khondkar - Member of Parliament (Lok Sabha) in 1999
 Hemanta Dora and Prashanta Dora (Ex-Football Player of India National Team)
 One ex-student organization was also there in the name of PATHIKRIT. They took a very active part in the Golden jubilee celebration of the school

See also
Education in India
List of schools in India
Education in West Bengal

References

External links

High schools and secondary schools in West Bengal
Schools in Hooghly district
Serampore
Educational institutions established in 1963
1963 establishments in West Bengal